Jonathan Neil Guthrie (born 29 July 1992) is an English professional footballer who plays as a defender for Northampton Town. 

He began his career with Pewsey Vale and has also played for Crewe Alexandra, Leek Town, Walsall and Livingston.

Club career
Guthrie was born in Devizes, Wiltshire. He started his career with Pewsey Vale, progressing through the youth system before playing for the first-team in the Wessex League from the age of 16.

Crewe Alexandra
In September 2011, he joined League Two side Crewe Alexandra on a 10-week trial. In February 2012, he signed his first professional contract with Crewe, on an 18-month deal. In March 2012, he joined Northern Premier League side Leek Town on loan, where he made a total of 8 appearances.

He made his professional debut for Crewe on 23 October 2012, in a 2–1 win over Swindon Town in League One, coming on as a late substitute for Michael West. He scored his first professional goal on 27 February 2016, against Barnsley. The following month, he signed a new contract at Crewe through to the summer of 2017 and in August 2016 was offered a new contract beyond 2017. In March 2017, he was sidelined with a hernia problem.

On 9 May 2017, Crewe said Guthrie's contract offer remained open but manager David Artell gave a 22 May deadline for a decision, otherwise the offer would be "ripped up". On 23 May it was confirmed that Guthrie would be leaving the club.

Walsall
On 22 June 2017, Guthrie agreed to join League One side Walsall on a two-year contract. He scored his first goal for the club on 10 February 2018, in a 2–2 draw with Blackpool at Bloomfield Road. He made 52 appearances during his first season with the club, scoring once.

Guthrie continued to be a regular in the first team, making 49 appearances in all competitions during the 2018–19 season, including scoring a brace in a 2–3 loss to Portsmouth on 12 March 2019. He was released by Walsall at the end of the 2018–19 season.

Livingston
On 12 August 2019, Guthrie joined Livingston of the Scottish Premiership on a two-year deal with an option of a third.

Northampton Town
on 24 June 2021 it was announced Guthrie had joined Northampton Town on a two year contract.

Career statistics

Honours 
Individual

 PFA Team of the Year: League Two 2021–22
 EFL League Two Team of the Season: 2021–22

References

External links

1992 births
Living people
People from Devizes
English footballers
Association football defenders
Pewsey Vale F.C. players
Crewe Alexandra F.C. players
Leek Town F.C. players
Walsall F.C. players
Livingston F.C. players
Northampton Town F.C. players
English Football League players
Scottish Professional Football League players
Wessex Football League players